Elfrida Andrée (19 February 1841 – 11 January 1929), was a Swedish organist, composer, and conductor. A 1996 recording on the Caprice label features Andrée's piano quintet, along with a piano sonata, the string quartet in D minor, and vocal music. She was the sister of Swedish opera singer-soprano Fredrika Stenhammar.

Life and career
Andrée was born in Visby to the doctor Andreas Andrée. She was the pupil of Ludvig Norman and Niels Wilhelm Gade. Her sister was the singer Fredrika Stenhammar. An activist in the Swedish women's movement, she was one of the first female organists to be officially appointed in Scandinavia. She began work in Stockholm in 1861 and became the organist at Gothenburg Cathedral in 1867, where she remained the organist until her death. In 1897 she was named leader of the Gothenburg Workers Institute Concerts, establishing her reputation as the first Swedish woman to conduct a symphony orchestra. For her services, she was elected to the Royal Swedish Academy of Music. She died in Gothenburg. During her career, she won the Litteris et Artibus award in 1895, as well as the Idun "Women's Academy" Fellowship in 1908.  

Andrée's two organ symphonies are still being played today. Her other compositions include the opera Fritiofs saga (1899, libretto by Selma Lagerlöf), several works for orchestra including two symphonies, a piano quartet in A minor (1870) and a piano quintet in E minor (published in 1865), a piano trio in G minor (1887) (and another published posthumously in C minor), a string quartet in D minor from 1861 and another in A major, pieces for violin (including sonatas in E flat and B flat major) and for piano, two Swedish masses, an 1879 choral ballade "Snöfrid", and lieder.

References

External links
 
Elfrida Andree Piano Quintet in e minor, sound-bites

Swedish Musical Heritage - Elfrida Andrée
Selective discography (in French)
Songs by Elfrieda Andrée on The Art Song Project

Further reading
Eva Öhrström, Elfrida Andrée : ett levnadsöde Stockholm: Prisma, 1999. .
English translation of Eva Öhrström biographical article (above) https://skbl.se/en/article/ElfridaAndree 
 
Elfrida Andree by Elsa Stuart-Bergstrom

1841 births
1929 deaths
19th-century classical composers
19th-century women composers
19th-century Swedish musicians
19th-century Swedish women musicians
19th-century Swedish people
20th-century classical composers
20th-century women composers
20th-century conductors (music)
Cathedral organists
Women classical composers
Feminist musicians
People from Gotland
Pupils of Niels Gade
Romantic composers
Swedish classical composers
Swedish classical organists
Swedish conductors (music)
Swedish women composers
Swedish women classical composers
Swedish feminists
Women conductors (music)
Women organists
20th-century Swedish women